Kannur Jan Shatabdi Express is a Jan Shatabdi Express train belonging to Trivandrum Division of Southern Railway zone of Indian Railways that runs between Thiruvananthapuram  Central and Kannur in Kerala state of India. It is the fastest express train between these two cities running via Kottayam and it is the longest-running Jan Shatabdi Express of Southern Railway and third longest Jan shatabdi in India.

History
Initially it ran between Thiruvananthapuram and Kozhikode, but owing to public demand it was extended to Kannur in 2013.

The train is one among the popular commuter trains in Kerala state along with its counterpart, the 12075/76 Calicut Jan Shatabdi Express, which runs via Alappuzha.

Route
Kannur Jan Shatabdi Express covers the distance of 500 km between Thiruvananthapuram and Kannur in about 9½ hours, making it the second fastest train between the two cities after the Thiruvananthapuram Rajdhani Express. It has 13 halts and the stoppages are at Thalassery , Vadakara , Kozhikode , Tirur , Shoranur Junction , Thrissur , Ernakulam Town , Kottayam , Tiruvalla,  Chengannur , Mavelikkara , Kayamkulam Jn and Kollam Junction, Thiruvananthapuram

Coach composition

The train has 18 coaches of which 15 are second-class sitting coaches(including 2 SLRs) and 3 are AC Chair car coaches.

Recent news

Malayalam film actor Nivin Pauly once boarded the train from Trivandrum central amidst huge fans for the promotion of his film "Kayamkulam Kochunni".
People from Kasargod have been seeking an extension of the train from Kannur to Kasargod.The train, one of the fastest ones to reach Trivandrum caters to people who need to go to RCC, Secretariat etc. They have to travel from Kasargod to Kannur and spend a harrowing night waiting to board the train that leaves the next day. The railways have not made any decision on this.
Also, it is noted that this train along with its counterpart (TVC-CLT JHANASHATBDI) have been running with conventional Jhanashatbdi coaches since its maiden run, whereas all other Jhanashatbdis are being given new LHB coaches. The railway has not announced when the train will be converted to LHB.

References

4.https://www.thehindubusinessline.com/2002/11/02/stories/2002110201991700.htm

External links
Kannur-Thiruvananthapuram Jan Shatabdi Express on India Rail Info

Transport in Kannur
Jan Shatabdi Express trains
Rail transport in Kerala
Transport in Thiruvananthapuram